Yelena Vasilyevna Belevskaya (born October 11, 1963) is a former long jumper who competed for the Soviet Union until 1991 and then Belarus. She is the 1987 World Championship silver medallist and finished fourth at the 1988 Olympic Games. Her best-ever jump of 7.39 metres on 18 July 1987, ranks her sixth on the world all-time list.

Career
Born in Yevpatoria, Crimea, Ukrainian SSR, Belevskaya trained at Trudovye Rezervy in Minsk. She finished second at the 1986 Goodwill Games on 7 July behind team-mate Galina Chistyakova, with  a jump of 7.17 metres and won the Soviet title a week later with 7.31 metres. A month later she finished a disappointing eighth at the 1986 European Championships, with a best of 6.58 metres.

After winning bronze medals at the European and World Indoor Championships, Belevskaya successfully defended her Soviet title in July 1987 with her career-best jump of 7.39 metres. This jump put her fourth on the world all-time list at that time and as of 2017 still ranks her sixth on the all-time list. She went on to win a silver medal at the 1987 World Championships in Rome, finishing behind Jackie Joyner-Kersee and one centimeter ahead of Heike Drechsler, with 7.14 metres. At the 1988 Seoul Olympics, she jumped 7.04 metres to finish fourth in the final behind Joyner-Kersee, Drechsler and Chistyakova.

Achievements
All results regarding long jump

References

External links

1963 births
Living people
People from Yevpatoria
Soviet female long jumpers
Belarusian female long jumpers
Belarusian people of Ukrainian descent
Olympic athletes of the Soviet Union
Athletes (track and field) at the 1988 Summer Olympics
World Athletics Championships medalists
Goodwill Games medalists in athletics
World Athletics Indoor Championships medalists
Competitors at the 1986 Goodwill Games